The Dornier Do 10, originally designated Dornier Do C4, was the name given by the Reichsluftfahrtministerium (RLM) of a pre-World War II German aircraft.

It was a two-seat parasol-wing monoplane, intended to be used as a fighter. Two prototypes were built in 1931 to fulfil a requirement for a two-seat fighter. Having failed to gain a production order, the Do C4 / Do 10 was used to test a tilting engine installation and propellers to suit, for STOL tests.

Specifications

Sources

Luftwaffe 39-45  
Histaviation.com
Virtual Aviation Museum

Notes

Bibliography

 Green, William and Swanborough, Gordon. The Complete Book of Fighters. New York: Smithmark, 1994. .

(Information on this model is difficult to come by and the nature of the relationship between C1/C4/10 is not yet totally resolved)

 

Do 010
1930s German fighter aircraft
Single-engined tractor aircraft
Parasol-wing aircraft
Aircraft first flown in 1931